Szendrő is a small town in Borsod-Abaúj-Zemplén county, Northern Hungary,  from county capital Miskolc.

History
Szendrő was first mentioned in 1317. It was named after its owner Szend. Szendro is a Hungarian last name. The first stone-built castle of the county was built there, and it was an important border fortress during the Turkish occupation of Hungary, until Prince Francis II Rákóczi had it destroyed in 1707.

Szendrő was the capital of the comitatus between 1613 and 1660, and the centre of the Szendrő district between 1615 and 1930. The railway line of the Bódva valley (built in 1896) strengthened its role as a market town.

Szendrő obtained town status in 1996.

Twin towns – sister cities

Szendrő is twinned with:
 Leutershausen, Germany

References

External links

  in Hungarian

Populated places in Borsod-Abaúj-Zemplén County